Jerome Motto (October 16, 1921 – January 4, 2015) was an American psychiatrist who conducted the first suicide prevention intervention that reduced deaths by suicide, as proven through a randomized controlled trial.  The study involved mailing short letters that expressed the researchers' interest in the recipients without pressuring them to take any action.

Motto's approach is sometimes called the "Caring Letters" model of suicide prevention.  The approach, which was partly inspired by Motto's experience of receiving letters during World War II from a young woman he had met before being deployed, sent a letter from a researcher who had spoken at length with the recipient during a suicidal crisis.  The typewritten form letters were brief – sometimes as little as two sentences – personally signed by the researcher, and expressed interest in the recipient without making any demands.  They were sent monthly at the beginning, and eventually decreased to quarterly letters; if the recipient wrote back, then an additional personal letter was mailed.  Although the exact mechanisms can be debated, researchers generally think that they communicate a genuine interest and social connection that the recipients find helpful.

Caring letters is inexpensive and either the only, or one of very few, approaches to suicide prevention that has been scientifically proven to work during the first years after a suicide attempt that resulted hospitalization.

Jerome Motto died on January 4, 2015, at Mills Peninsula Hospital in Burlingame, California.

Publications

References

External links 
 Research summary at Stanford University's SPARQ (Social Psychological Answers to Real-world Questions)

1921 births
2015 deaths
American psychiatrists
American military personnel of World War II